Continental Lake is a lake in northern Humboldt County, Nevada, United States.

Continental Lake was named by a group of early settlers who had embarked on a trans-continental journey.

See also
 List of lakes in Nevada

References

Lakes of Humboldt County, Nevada